The 2020 Cotton Bowl Classic was a college football bowl game played on December 30, 2020, with kickoff at 8:00 p.m. EST (7:00 p.m. local CST) on ESPN. It was the 85th edition of the Cotton Bowl Classic, and was one of the 2020–21 bowl games concluding the 2020 FBS football season. Sponsored by the Goodyear Tire and Rubber Company, the game was officially known as the Goodyear Cotton Bowl Classic.

Teams
As one of the New Year's Six bowl games, the participants of the game were determined by the College Football Playoff selection committee. The committee matched No. 7 Florida of the Southeastern Conference (SEC) against No. 6 Oklahoma of the Big 12 Conference. The teams had only met once previously, a 24–14 Florida victory in the 2009 BCS National Championship Game. Several players from both teams opted not to participate in the game, choosing to prepare for the 2021 NFL Draft. The opt-outs included three of Florida's receivers: Trevon Grimes, Kyle Pitts, and Kadarius Toney.

Florida Gators

Florida entered the bowl with an 8–3 record. The Gators were 8–2 in SEC play, then lost the SEC Championship Game to top-ranked Alabama. The Gators' other losses were to Texas A&M and LSU. Florida defeated one ranked team during the season, Georgia. This was the Gators' first appearance in a Cotton Bowl.

Oklahoma Sooners

Oklahoma entered the bowl with an 8–2 record. The Sooners were 6–2 in Big 12 play, then won the Big 12 Championship Game over Iowa State. The Sooners had lost earlier in the season to Iowa State; their only other loss was to Kansas State. Oklahoma defeated two ranked teams during conference play; Texas and Oklahoma State. The Sooners had played in two prior Cotton Bowls, winning in January 2002 and losing in January 2013.

Game summary

Statistics

The Sooners tied the Cotton Bowl record for most points scored, with 55, and set new Cotton Bowl records for rushing yards, with 435, and total yards, with 684.

See also
 2021 Rose Bowl, scheduled at the same venue two days later

Notes

References

External links

Game statistics at statbroadcast.com

Cotton Bowl Classic
Cotton Bowl Classic
Cotton Bowl Classic
Cure Bowl
Florida Gators football bowl games
Oklahoma Sooners football bowl games